The Goldfields spiny-tailed gecko (Strophurus assimilis) is a species of lizard in the family Diplodactylidae. The species is endemic to Australia.

Geographic range
S. assimilis is found in the interior of southern Western Australia.

Habitat
The natural habitat of S. assimilis is shrubland in arid and semiarid areas.

Reproduction
S. assimilis is oviparous.

References

Further reading
Cogger HG (2014). Reptiles and Amphibians of Australia, Seventh Edition. Clayton, Victoria, Australia: CSIRO Publishing. xxx + 1,033 pp. .
Greer AE (1989). The Biology and Evolution of Australian Lizards. Chipping Norton, New South Wales: Surrey Beatty & Sons. 264 pp. .
Laube A, Langner C (2007). "Die Gattung Strophurus [=The Genus Strophurus]". Draco 8 (29): 49–66. (in German).
Rösler H (2000). "Kommentierte Liste der rezent, subrezent und fossil bekannten Geckotaxa (Reptilia: Gekkonomorpha) [= Annotated list of the recent, subrecent and fossil known Geckotaxa (Reptilia: Gekkonomorpha)]". Gekkota 22: 28–153. (Strophurus assimilis, p. 115). (in German).
Storr GM (1988). "The Diplodactylus ciliaris complex (Lacertilia: Gekkonidae) in Western Australia". Records of the Western Australian Museum 14: 121–133. (Diplodactylus assimilis, new species, pp. 128–129, Figure 4).
Wilson, Steve; Swan, Gerry (2013). A Complete Guide to Reptiles of Australia, Fourth Edition. Sydney: New Holland Publishers. 522 pp. .

Strophurus
Reptiles described in 1988
Taxa named by Glen Milton Storr
Geckos of Australia